Sailing is the practice of navigating a sail-powered craft on water, ice, or land.

Sailing or Sailin' may also refer to:

 Sailing (sport), an organized sport

Music
 Sailin', an album by Kim Carnes, or the title song, 1976
 Sailing (album), by AKMU, 2019
 "Sailing" (AAA song), 2012
 "Sailing" (Christopher Cross song), 1980
 "Sailing" (Sutherland Brothers song), 1972; covered by Rod Stewart (1975)
 "Sailing (0805)", a song by Girls' Generation

Television
 "Sailing" (Balamory), a 2003 episode
 "Sailing" (Birds of a Feather), a 1989 episode

See also
 Saling (disambiguation)
 
 Solar sail, a method of spacecraft propulsion